The enzyme acetylsalicylate deacetylase (EC 3.1.1.55) catalyzes the reaction

acetylsalicylate + H2O  salicylate + acetate

This enzyme belongs to the family of hydrolases, specifically those acting on carboxylic ester bonds.  The systematic name is acetylsalicylate O-acetylhydrolase. Other names in common use include aspirin esterase, acetylsalicylic acid esterase, and aspirin hydrolase.

References

 
 
 

EC 3.1.1
Enzymes of unknown structure